Lee Yun-oh (born 23 March 1999) is a South Korean footballer who currently plays as a goalkeeper for Gamba Osaka U-23, on loan from Vegalta Sendai.

Career statistics

Club
.

Notes

References

External links

1999 births
Living people
South Korean footballers
South Korean expatriate footballers
Association football goalkeepers
J3 League players
Ulsan Hyundai FC players
Vegalta Sendai players
Fukushima United FC players
Gamba Osaka players
Gamba Osaka U-23 players
Daegu FC players
South Korean expatriate sportspeople in Japan
Expatriate footballers in Japan
Footballers from Seoul